Graham Nash (born 25 December 1979) is Countdown's 43rd Series Champion and the 11th Champion of Champions. His current record stands at 16 wins out of 16; one of only two unbeaten champions in the show's history - the other one being Nic Brown. He later appeared on Grand Slam, losing to Dee Voce.

Countdown 
Graham made his debut on Countdown on 20 July 2000 and won the maximum eight consecutive heat games making him the number one seed. However his points total was beaten by David Williams and he was knocked down to second seed.

However Williams fell in the semi-final, while Nash won his match against Clare Wright. This set up a final between Graham and Matthew Turner.

It was a close and nervous final, as both players had numerous words disallowed. The points were level until Graham got 901 correctly on the numbers game and Matthew only got 900. This ten-point lead remained until the last round, where Matthew could tie the game on the conundrum. But it was Graham who spotted RENEWABLE in six seconds and became the Series 43 Countdown champion.

Champion of Champions 
Graham returned three years later for the C of C. He was one of several unbeaten players, including Ben Wilson, Chris Wills and Julian Fell. Only one of them could remain unbeaten.

Graham's match against David Ballheimer was a comfortable enough win for him, although his second round match was anything but.

Graham and Julian Fell matched each other round for round, including the nine letter word ORGANISED / GRANDIOSE. Graham held a one-point lead going into the final round, and it was he who spotted the crucial conundrum to win the match 120 - 109. This tied the highest scoring match in history (229 total points)

Graham's semi-final was another excellent game. Tom Hargreaves came close to beating him, but when Graham offered CLEARINGS and Tom offered RESCALING, Tom's word was ruled invalid which gave Graham an extra 18 points. Indeed, Graham went on to win by 21 points, setting up a final with Series 47 unbeaten champion Chris Wills.

The final was a low-scoring affair, not helped by poor letters selections and difficult numbers games. Chris took the lead with GAMBADE but Graham pegged him back with PENSIVE and when Chris had MISTLE disallowed, Graham took a six-point lead. This lead remained until the final conundrum where Chris could solve it and win by four points. OVERSPADE was revealed and the full 30 seconds ticked away - neither contestant could solve it. As the clock ran out, Graham raised his arms and shouted with joy. He had just won Champion Of Champions 11, 15 wins out of 15.

Grand Slam 
Graham returned for the Channel 4 game show Grand Slam. The show was hosted by Countdown's own Carol Vorderman and former Football Italia presenter James Richardson. The show pitted sixteen of the UK's biggest game show winners against each other in order to find the greatest quiz player in the United Kingdom.

Graham's first round match was against Laura Richardson. Laura had a slender lead going into the general knowledge round, but panicked and gave away a massive 50 seconds, giving Graham a 68-second advantage going into the final round. Laura performed badly in the last round, and Graham won by a convincing 104 seconds.

Graham faced Dee Voce in the quarter-final. Dee had a 60.5 second lead going into the deciding round, and beat Graham by a firm 75.7 seconds. The eventual winner was Series 8 Countdown Champion and Scrabble ace Clive Spate.

The 1% Club

On 21st May 2022, Nash appeared on an episode of The 1% Club. With three players remaining he was asked which was the odd one out of the following words:-

Trojan
Dismay
Transept
Concoct
Justify

The answer being Justify as the other 4 end with the first few letters of a month of the year. Nash tried to argue that his answer of Transept because "it begins and ends in the same letter" should be accepted. There was a heated debate between him and the adjudicator but Nash eventually backed down. This incorrect answer eliminated him and Nash was visibly angry for the rest of the show. He left with no prize.

External links 
 an Interview with Graham
 The Series 43 Countdown final
 The 11th Champion Of Champions final
 A review of Graham's performance on GrandSlam

Contestants on British game shows
Countdown (game show)
Living people
1979 births